Lobelia tenuior, commonly known as slender lobelia, is a small herbaceous plant in the family Campanulaceae native to Western Australia.

It blooms between October and January producing blue flowers.

The species is found on sand dunes, among coastal limestone and in lowlying areas along the coast of the South West and Great Southern regions of Western Australia where it grows in sandy soils.

Subspecies

Lobelia tenuior subsp. tenuior 
Lobelia tenuior subsp. dictyosperma N.G.Walsh

References

tenuior
Flora of Western Australia
Plants described in 1810